Joe Fameyeh (born 19 October 1978) is a Ghanaian football striker.

Starting his career in a smaller club, he joined Accra Hearts of Oak in 1997. In the same year, he featured for Ghana in two friendly losses. In 1999 he became top goalscorer of the Ghana Premier League. He had trials with European clubs, including Vålerenga in 1996. In 2000 he moved to German sixth-tier club TSV Crailsheim, securing promotion to the fourth tier where he became a prolific goalscorer. He surpassed 20 goals in several seasons.

References

1978 births
Living people
Ghanaian footballers
Ghana international footballers
Accra Hearts of Oak S.C. players
Ghana Premier League players
Association football forwards
Ghanaian expatriate footballers
Expatriate footballers in Germany
Ghanaian expatriate sportspeople in Germany
Ghana Premier League top scorers